Wachsenburg may refer to:

Wachsenburg Castle, a castle in Thuringia, Germany
Amt Wachsenburg, a municipality in Thuringia, Germany
Wachsenburggemeinde, a former municipality in Thuringia, Germany